Keyite is a mineral with the chemical formula . The name comes from Charles Locke Key (born 1935), an American mineral dealer who furnished its first specimens.
Keyite is monoclinic-prismatic, meaning its crystal form has three unequal axes, two of which have 90° angles between them and one with an angle less than 90°.
Keyite belongs to the biaxial optical class, meaning it has more than one axis of anisotropy (optic axis), in which light travels with zero birefringence, and three indices of refraction, nα = 1.800, nβ, and nγ  = 1.870. Being a very rare cadmium copper arsenate, keyite is only found in Tsumeb, Namibia in the Tsumeb mine, a world-famous copper mine known for its abundance of rare and unusual minerals.

References

Arsenate minerals
Cadmium minerals
Copper(II) minerals
Zinc minerals
Monoclinic minerals
Minerals in space group 15
Minerals described in 1977